The Divisiones Regionales de Fútbol in the Community of Andalusia, are organized by the Federación Andaluza de Fútbol:
 División de Honor (Level 6 of the Spanish football pyramid)
 Primera Andaluza (Level 7)
 Segunda Andaluza (Level 8)
 Tercera Andaluza (Level 9)

League chronology

División de Honor

The División de Honor stands at the sixth level of Spanish football. All of the clubs are based in the autonomous community of Andalusia.

The League
At the end of the season, the champions of each group are promoted to the corresponding groups in the Tercera División RFEF (Group 9 and Group 10) and the runners-up playoff for possible promotion. If there any vacancies further in Tercera RFEF, a playoff must take place between teams qualified 3rd to fill possible vacancies. The bottom three teams in each group are relegated to the Primera Andaluza.

2022–23 season teams

Champions

Primera Andaluza

Primera Andaluza is the seventh level of competition of the Spanish Football League in Andalusia.

The League
The Primera Andaluza is played with 140 teams in eight groups of 16-19. At the end of the season, the champions and runners-up are promoted and the 3rd placed teams playoff to fill any vacancies. Four clubs are relegated to Primera Categoría Provincial except those groups with 17 or 19 teams relegating five clubs.

Some teams playing in this level
Écija
Español del Alquián
Guadix
Ronda
San Roque
San José

Segunda Andaluza

Segunda Andaluza is the eighth level of competition of the Spanish Football League in Andalusia.

The League
The Segunda Andaluza is played with 222 teams in 15 groups of 10-18. At the end of the season, four clubs being promoted to each province's Regional Preferente. Four clubs each from Cádiz and Granada and eight clubs from Seville are relegated to Segunda Categoría Provincial.

Tercera Andaluza

Tercera Andaluza is the ninth level of competition of the Spanish Football League in Andalusia.

The League
The Tercera Andaluza is played with 107 teams in 7 groups of 12-16 teams. At the end of the season, in Cádiz and Granada, the top four teams are promoted while the five champions and the best runner-up are promoted en Sevilla plus two playoff winners between the other four runners-up.

Some teams playing in this level
Motril Atlético
UD Algaida

External links
Federación Andaluza de Fútbol
LaPreferente
Futbolme

Football in Andalusia
Divisiones Regionales de Fútbol
Primera Andaluza